The gens Opiternia was a Faliscan family occurring in Roman history.  The nomen Opiternius is a patronymic surname, derived from the ancient praenomen Opiter, as is the related Opetreius, and perhaps shares a common root with the nomina of the gentes Oppia and Opsia.

The only member of this gens mentioned in ancient historians was Lucius Opiternius, a priest of Bacchus, who helped introduce the Bacchanalia at Rome, the discovery of which in 186 BC threw the senate into panic.

See also
 List of Roman gentes

References

Bibliography
 Titus Livius (Livy), History of Rome.
 George Davis Chase, "The Origin of Roman Praenomina", in Harvard Studies in Classical Philology, vol. VIII (1897).

Roman gentes